Thomas Schwab (born 20 April 1962 in Berchtesgaden, Bavaria) is a West German luger who competed in the late 1980s. Together with Wolfgang Staudinger he won the bronze medal in the men's doubles event at the 1988 Winter Olympics in Calgary, representing West Germany.

Schwab also won a bronze medal in the men's doubles event at the 1987 FIL World Luge Championships in Igls, Austria. He also won two gold medals at the 1988 FIL European Luge Championships in Königssee, West Germany (Men's doubles and mixed team). Schwab won the overall Luge World Cup men's doubles title in 1986–7.

From 1994 to 2008, he was head coach of all male and female lugers of Germany's  A-Group, succeeding Josef Lenz at this position. Since the 1994 Winter Olympics, his athletes have won a total of 129 medals in the Winter Olympics, world championships, and European championships. In February 2008, Schwab was named secretary general and sports director for the German bobsleigh and luge federation (BSD), effective in May. He was replaced as head coach of the German luge team by Norbert Loch, father of 2008 men's single world champion Felix.

References

External links
DatabaseOlympics.com information on Schwab
FIL-Luge.org February 27, 2008 article on Schwab's promotion.
Fuzilogik Sports - Winter Olympic results - Men's luge
Hickoksports.com results on Olympic champions in luge and skeleton.
Hickok sports information on World champions in luge and skeleton.
List of men's doubles luge World Cup champions since 1978.

1962 births
Living people
People from Berchtesgaden
Sportspeople from Upper Bavaria
German male lugers
Lugers at the 1984 Winter Olympics
Lugers at the 1988 Winter Olympics
Olympic bronze medalists for West Germany
Olympic medalists in luge
Medalists at the 1988 Winter Olympics
20th-century German people